.22 Winchester Centerfire (.22 WCF) is a small centerfire cartridge introduced in 1885 for use in the Winchester Model 1885 single-shot rifle. Factory manufacture of ammunition was discontinued in 1936. The .22 WCF was loaded with a 45 grain bullet with a muzzle velocity of about 1550 feet per second, similar to the performance of the .22 Winchester Rimfire (.22 WRF) designed in 1890.

Experimentation with the .22 WCF among civilian wildcatters and the U.S. military at Springfield Armory in the 1920s led to the development of the .22 Hornet cartridge.

Sources
Barnes, Frank C., Cartridges of the World, Northfield, IL: DBI Books, 1972. .

References

Pistol and rifle cartridges
22 Centerfire